Olavi Tupamäki (born 21 October 1944) is a Finnish engineer and politician, born in Petäjävesi. He was a member of the Parliament of Finland, representing the Finnish Rural Party (SMP) from 1970 to 1972 and the Finnish People's Unity Party (SKYP) from 1972 to 1975.

References

1944 births
Living people
People from Petäjävesi
Finnish Rural Party politicians
Finnish People's Unity Party politicians
Members of the Parliament of Finland (1970–72)
Members of the Parliament of Finland (1972–75)